The 2015 Taça da Liga Final was the final match of the 2014–15 Taça da Liga, the eighth season of the Taça da Liga.

Trophy holders Benfica beat Marítimo (2–1) to win a record sixth title in the competition. Goal-line technology was introduced in the final, for the first time in Portugal.

Route to the final

Note: In all results below, the score of the finalist is given first (H: home; A: away).

Match

Details

References

2015
Taca da Liga
S.L. Benfica matches
C.S. Marítimo matches